Missan Kalar railway station is located in Sheikhupura District, Punjab, Pakistan. The surrounding villages include Missan and Missan Kalar, divided by the M2. Nearest motorway entry point is Kot Abdul Malik toll plaza.

See also
 List of railway stations in Pakistan
 Pakistan Railways

References

External links

Railway stations in Sheikhupura District
Railway stations on Shahdara Bagh–Sangla Hill Branch Line